Tomislav Crnković (born 1956) is a former Croatian male canoeist who won a world championship at senior level at the Wildwater Canoeing World Championships.

Crnković is the Chairman of the ICF Whitewater Committee.

References

External links
 Tomislav Crnković at ICF

1956 births
Living people
Croatian male canoeists